Kodiveeran ( Flag Warrior) is a 2017 Indian Tamil-language  action drama film written and directed by M. Muthaiah. Sasikumar and Mahima Nambiar are playing as the lead pair in this movie alongside Vidharth, Pasupathy, Shamna Kasim, Sanusha, and Bala Saravanan in supporting roles. This is Sasikumar and Muthaiah's second collaboration after Kutti Puli. Kodiveeran is produced by Sasikumar's Company Productions. The music was composed by N. R. Raghunanthan, cinematography by S. R. Kathir, and editing by Venkat Raajen. The film released on 7 December 2017.

Plot
Kodiveeran (M. Sasikumar), is a hindu priest who protects his sister from bad guys. In his village in the Dindigul district, corruption and injustice often happens mostly by Adhigaaram, a factory owner, whose men chase and kill anyone who protests against Adhigaaram. Kodiveeran knows of Adhigaaram's tricks and always beats up his goons if they cause any trouble to the village. In the present day, Villangam Vellaikkaran (Pasupathy) is released from jail and comes to his village where his sister, Velu (Shamna Kasim) is filled with joy to meet him. Kodiveeran and Villangam were enemies as Villangam is a big criminal who brutally kills anyone for money. He gets money from fellow politicians or factory owners who are very wealthy. Adhigaaram has also married Velu so that Villangam can help him with any problems. Kodiveeran hears about Villangam's release from jail and threatens him if he kills or hurts anyone, then he will die. The rest of the story deals with how Kodiveeran saves his family from Villangam and Adhigaaram's goons.

Cast

Production 
This is the director M. Muthaiah's fourth film after Kutti Puli, Komban and Marudhu. This is also touted to be a village entertainer like his previous movies and this is based on brother-sister relationship. Sasikumar is the lead actor and producer of this movie. Poorna has also been signed to do an important role in this movie. Director wanted to sign Arjun for antagonist's role, but they decided to sign Madha Yaanai Koottam fame Vikram Sukumaran. Vidharth is signed in to play brother-in-law role of Sasikumar. The first schedule for filming has begun at Madurai from March 2017. Its reported that Poorna is doing negative role in this movie and for that she is going bald. S. R. Kathir handling camera and N. R. Raghunanthan composing music and Venkat Raajen is editing for this film. The film's release date was 30 November 2017.

Release
The satellite rights of the film were sold to Zee Tamil.

Soundtrack 
The music was composed by N. R. Raghunanthan. There are six tracks in the movie, which are as follows.

References

External links 
 

2010s Tamil-language films
2017 films
Indian action drama films
2017 action drama films
Films shot in Madurai
Films directed by M. Muthaiah